Niederried railway station is a Swiss railway station in the village and municipality of Niederried bei Interlaken and the canton of Bern. Niederried is a stop on the Brünig line, owned by the Zentralbahn, that operates between Interlaken and Lucerne.

Services 
The following services stop at Niederried:

References

External links 
 
 

Railway stations in the canton of Bern
Niederried bei Interlaken
Zentralbahn stations